Kutayfāt, also known as Abu Ali Ahmed ibn al-Afdal or al-Afdal Kutayfāt, (d. 1131) was vizier and amīr al-juyūsh (commander of the armies) to al-Hafiz, Caliph of Egypt, from 1130-1131.  He seized power by imprisoning al-Hafiz but was murdered by Fatimid forces loyal to the caliph.  Kutayfāt was the son of al-Afdal Shahanshah and grandson of Badr al-Jamali, and so the third generation of Armenians serving as Fatimid vizier.

References 

 
 
 Encyclopedia Islamica, Farhad Daftary and Wilferd Madelung, editors, Leyde-Boston, Brill, 2008
 
 Riley-Smith, Jonathan, The First Crusaders, 1095-1131, Cambridge University Press, London, 1997, pgs. 180-2, 186-7
 

Viziers of the Fatimid Caliphate
1131 deaths
Assassinated heads of state
Ethnic Armenian Shia Muslims
12th-century people from the Fatimid Caliphate
Leaders who took power by coup